Jonas Zickert (born 25 August 1997) is a German footballer who plays as a midfielder for NOFV-Oberliga Nord club VfB Krieschow.

References

External links
 Profile at FuPa.net

1997 births
Sportspeople from Cottbus
Footballers from Brandenburg
Living people
German footballers
Association football midfielders
FC Energie Cottbus players
3. Liga players
Regionalliga players
Oberliga (football) players